is a Japanese racing driver. She won the TCR Japan Saturday Series in the Bronze category in 2020, racing for Drago Corse and was also the first female driver in the series.

References

External links
 

2000 births
Living people
Japanese female racing drivers
Sportspeople from Osaka Prefecture

Japanese F4 Championship drivers